Richard Lorenz (born 1 March 1901; date of death unknown) is an Austrian bobsledder who competed from the late 1920s to the mid-1930s.

Competing in two Winter Olympics, he earned his best finish of 11th in the four-man event at Garmisch-Partenkirchen in 1936. In 1928 he finished 22nd in the four-man event.

References
1928 bobsleigh five-man results
1936 bobsleigh four-man results
1936 Olympic Winter Games official report. - p. 415.

1901 births
Year of death missing
Austrian male bobsledders
Olympic bobsledders of Austria
Bobsledders at the 1928 Winter Olympics
Bobsledders at the 1936 Winter Olympics